Douglas L. Coleman (6 October 1931 – 16 April 2014) was a scientist and professor at The Jackson Laboratory, in Bar Harbor, Maine. His work predicted that the ob gene encoded the hormone leptin, later co-discovered in 1994 by Jeffrey Friedman, Rudolph Leibel and their research teams at Rockefeller University. This work has had a major role in our understanding of the mechanisms regulating body weight and that cause of human obesity.

Coleman was born in Stratford, Ontario. He obtained his BS degree from McMaster University in 1954 and his PhD in Biochemistry from the University of Wisconsin in 1958. He was elected a member of the US National Academy of Sciences in 1998. He won the Shaw Prize in 2009, the Albert Lasker Award for Basic Medical Research in 2010, the 2012 BBVA Foundation Frontiers of Knowledge Award in the Biomedicine category and the 2013 King Faisal International Prize for Medicine jointly with Jeffrey M. Friedman for the discovery of leptin.

References 

Canadian biochemists
University of Wisconsin–Madison College of Agricultural and Life Sciences alumni
1931 births
2014 deaths
Members of the United States National Academy of Sciences
Recipients of the Albert Lasker Award for Basic Medical Research
McMaster University alumni
Scientists from Ontario
20th-century Canadian scientists
21st-century Canadian scientists